The abbreviation NCIP may refer to:
NISO Circulation Interchange Protocol
National Commission on Indigenous Peoples of the Philippines
Novel coronavirus-infected pneumonia